Abdulkhakim Isakovich Ismailov (1 July 1916 – 17 February 2010) was a soldier in Red Army during World War II. He was photographed by Yevgeny Khaldei raising the flag of the Soviet Union over the Reichstag in Berlin on 2 May 1945, days before Nazi Germany's surrender.

Abdulkhakim Ismailov, a native of Dagestan of the Kumyk ethnicity, was severely wounded five times during World War II, including the Battle of Stalingrad, but constantly returned to the frontline. According to his own words, he was born in Aksay village, not in Chagar otar, as stated officially.

The iconic photograph of Raising a flag over the Reichstag has been compared to the picture of American Marines raising the Flag on Iwo Jima in the Pacific theater. Photographer Yevgeny Khaldei recruited three Soviet soldiers for the picture – Aleksei Kovalyev, a teenager, held the flag over the Reichstag, while Ismailov and Aleksei Goryachev also appeared hoisting the flag in the photograph. Ismailov's role in the photograph remained unknown until Kovalyev identified Ismailov in a 1995 television documentary. Ismailov was honored as a Hero of Russia in 1996.

Abdulkhakim Ismailov died in his native village of Chagar-Otar, Khasavyurtovsky District, Dagestan, Russia, on 17 February 2010, at the age of 93.

Awards and decorations

References

1916 births
2010 deaths
People from Khasavyurtovsky District
People from Dagestan Oblast
Kumyks
Soviet military personnel of World War II
Battle of Berlin
Heroes of the Russian Federation
People notable for being the subject of a specific photograph
Recipients of the Medal "For Courage" (Russia)
Recipients of the Order of Glory
Recipients of the Medal of Zhukov